Stabat Mater, FP 148, is a musical setting of the Stabat Mater sequence composed by Francis Poulenc in 1950.

Background
Poulenc wrote the piece in response to the death of his friend, artist Christian Bérard; he considered writing a Requiem for Bérard, but, after returning to the shrine of the Black Virgin of Rocamadour, he selected the medieval Stabat Mater text.  Poulenc's setting, scored for soprano solo, mixed chorus, and orchestra, premiered on the 13th of June 1951 at the Strasbourg Festival. It was well received throughout Europe and in the United States where it won the New York Critic's Circle Award for Best Choral Work of the year.

Structure 
The Stabat Mater is divided into twelve movements, which vary dramatically in character from somber to light and frivolous, even on the most serious of texts. All the movements, though, are relatively brief; Robert Shaw's Telarc recording runs just under 30 minutes, with the longest movement taking just over four minutes.

 Stabat mater dolorosa (Très calme) 
 Cujus animam gementem (Allegro molto—Très violent)
 O quam tristis (Très lent)
 Quae moerebat (Andantino)
 Quis est homo (Allegro molto—Prestissimo)
 Vidit suum (Andante)
 Eja mater (Allegro)
 Fac ut ardeat (Maestoso)
 Sancta mater (Moderato—Allegretto)
 Fac ut portem (To. de Sarabande)
 Inflammatus et accensus (Animé et très rythmé)
 Quando corpus (Très calme)

The soprano soloist appears in only three movements: Vidit suum, Fac ut portem, and Quando corpus. The chorus appears largely a cappella in two others, O quam tristis and Fac ut ardeat, although the orchestra is not fully silent in either.

Instrumentation
 Piccolo, 2 flutes, 2 oboes, English horn, 2 clarinets (B♭), bass clarinet, 3 bassoons
 4 French horns, 3 trumpets (C), 3 trombones, tuba
 Timpani, 2 Harps
 Strings 
 Soprano solo, SATBarB Chorus (divisi)

Selected Recordings

References

Source texts
 Hell, Henri 1959, Francis Poulenc, London: John Calder
 Ivry, Benjamin 1996, Francis Poulenc (20th-Century Composers series), Phaidon Press, .
 Mellers, Wilfrid 1993, Francis Poulenc, New York: Oxford University Press

External links
 Latin text and English translation at Johnrpierce.com

Compositions by Francis Poulenc
Poulenc, Francis
1950 compositions